The Maxi - Single is an EP released in Japan to introduce the upcoming album Clown in the Mirror by the Danish progressive metal band Royal Hunt. The song "Bad Luck" appears only on this release.

Track listing
All songs written by André Andersen.
 "Clown in the Mirror" – 4:37
 "Stranded" (Acoustic Version) – 3:23
 "Land of Broken Hearts" (Acoustic Version) – 3:58
 "Age Gone Wild" (Acoustic Version) – 4:05
 "Kingdom Dark" (Acoustic Version) – 3:05
 "Bad Luck" – 3:17

Personnel
André Andersen – keyboards, piano, rhythm and acoustic guitars
Henrik Brockmann – lead and backing vocals
Jacob Kjaer - guitars
Steen Mogensen – bass guitar
Kenneth Olsen – drums

with
Carsten Olsen - additional backing vocals
Maria Norfelt - additional backing vocals
Maria Mcturk - additional backing vocals

Production
Recorded at Mirand Studio, Copenhagen
Mixed by André Andersen at House Of Music, New Jersey, USA
Mastered at Sterling Sound by George Marino
Art direction by Martin Burridge

External links
Heavy Harmonies page

Royal Hunt albums
1994 EPs